Joseph Srampickal is an Indian Syro-Malabar Catholic bishop. In 2016, he was appointed the first bishop of the Eparchy of Great Britain, which had been erected by Pope Francis the same year.

Early life 
Joseph Srampickal was born on 30 May 1967 in Poovarany, in the Eparchy of Palai.

Education 
He studied philosophy at St. Thomas Apostolic Seminary, Vadavathoor, and theology at the Pontifical Urbaniana University in Rome, where he obtained a licentiate in biblical theology. He continued his studies at the University of Oxford.

Priesthood 
Ordained a priest on 12 August 2000, he has held the following positions: professor at the minor seminary and Ephrem Formation Centre of Pala, Director of the Mar Sleeva Nursing College, Director of the Evangelization Programme, secretary of the bishop; and pastor at Urulikunnam. From 2013, he was Vice Rector of the Pontifical Urbaniana College of the Propaganda Fide, Rome.

Episcopate 
He was Appointed Bishop of Syro-Malabar Catholic Eparchy of Great Britain on 28 July 2016 by Pope Francis and ordained bishop on 9 October 2015 by George Alencherry.

References 

1967 births
Living people
Syro-Malabar bishops
Bishops appointed by Pope Francis